Arcani is a commune in Gorj County, Oltenia, Romania. It is composed of four villages: Arcani, Câmpofeni, Sănătești and Stroiești.

References

Communes in Gorj County
Localities in Oltenia